Ohler, or Öhler, is a surname. Notable people with the surname include:

 Aloys Karl Ohler (1817–1889), German cleric
 Pete Ohler (1940–2021), Canadian football player and coach

Companies include:
 Kastner & Öhler, Austrian chain of department stores

See also
Öhler system
Oehler